The 1956 Soviet football championship was the 24th seasons of competitive football in the Soviet Union and the 18th among teams of sports societies and factories. Spartak Moscow won the championship becoming the Soviet domestic champions for the sixth time.

Honours

Notes = Number in parentheses is the times that club has won that honour. * indicates new record for competition

Soviet Union football championship

Class A

Class B

Group I

Group II

Top goalscorers

Class A
Vasiliy Buzunov (ODO Sverdlovsk) – 17 goals

References

External links
 1956 Soviet football championship. RSSSF